Johan's spiny mouse (Acomys johannis) is a species of rodent in the family Muridae.
It is found in Benin, Burkina Faso, Cameroon, Chad, Ghana, Mali, Niger, Nigeria, and Togo. Its natural habitats are subtropical or tropical dry shrubland, subtropical or tropical dry lowland grassland, and rocky areas.

References

Acomys
Mammals described in 1912
Taxa named by Oldfield Thomas
Taxonomy articles created by Polbot